Two human polls made up the 2016–17 NCAA Division I men's ice hockey rankings, the USCHO.com/CBS College Sports poll and the USA Today/USA Hockey Magazine poll. As the 2016–17 season progressed, rankings were updated weekly.

Legend

USCHO

USA Today

^In the Week 13 poll (Jan 9) USA Today ranked Quinnipiac and St. Lawrence tied at 15th, with the Saints previously having been unranked in said poll.

References

NCAA Division I ice hockey
College men's ice hockey rankings in the United States